Rawda is a seaside district of Kuwait City in Kuwait. It comprises five blocks.It is one of the best areas in kuwait to live in. It has its own Park. It is Also the home for Al-Rawda and Hawally Coop, Which is one of the most successful Coops in kuwait. Neighboring Areas are: Adialiya, Nuzha, Hawally, Surra.

References

Suburbs of Kuwait City